Bosaso Tannery is a tannery headquartered in Bosaso, the commercial capital of the autonomous Puntland state in northeastern Somalia.

Services and manufacturing

A ten-year-old manufacturing, distributing, wholesale and import/export company, the Bosaso Tannery processes wet salted, dry salted, wet blue, limed, pickled, and air/frame dried sheep and goat hides and skin. It has some of the highest quality natural skins on the continent.

Bosaso Tannery processes two kinds of hides and skins: wet blue and pickle. Natural chemicals are used in the production of the pickled variety.

The hides and skins are graded on a one to six scale. Lowest quality products are tiered according to a single (R), double (RR) or triple rejects system (RRR).

In total, daily turnover is 5,000 individual skins and 300 camel hides.

As of 2012, the company is moving toward ready-made leather production for eventual exportation to consumer markets in the Middle East and other areas.

Exports and distribution
Bosaso Tannery ships its goods from Bosaso to the Middle East, which takes about seven days to arrive in Dubai. From there, manufactured hides and skins are sent to importing countries.

A little over 90,000 tonnes of hides and skins are exported every year to Ethiopia, Turkey, Pakistan, India, China and Italy. Raw camel hides and sheep and goat skin are also dispatched to the United Arab Emirates.

The wet blue type is exported to the Middle East and various parts of Europe. In Spain and Germany, the pickled type is sent to meet the high demand.

Management and branches
The Bosaso Tannery is a joint venture firm, which is owned by local traders. With a staff of upwards of 1,000 workers, it has 106 branches throughout the Puntland region.

The company is managed by Director General Mohamed Dirye Hussein. He is also a majority shareholder in the firm.

See also
List of companies of Somalia

Notes

References

External links
Gulf Business - Bosaso Tannery

Companies established in the 2000s
Companies of Somalia
Bosaso
2000s establishments in Somalia